The John Henry Kirby State Forest is a  forest reserve located in Tyler County, Texas. Located just fourteen miles (21 km) south of Woodville and seventeen miles north of Kountze, it is used primarily for research by Texas A&M University. It is open to the public for picnics and touring only. The 6.6 mile Longleaf Nature Trail is located within the state forest. Any revenue generated is donated to student-loan programs at Texas A&M. The land was donated to the state by the lumber baron John Henry Kirby in 1929.

In the 1930s, the Civilian Conservation Corps planted trees, improved timber stands and constructed a residence, fire lookout tower, roads, fire breaks and bridges.

See also
 Texas Forest Trail
 List of Texas state forests
 List of botanical gardens and arboretums in the United States

References

External links
 Texas Forest Service website - Texas State Forests - John Henry Kirby Memorial State Forest

Protected areas of Tyler County, Texas
Texas state forests